Gulmohar Enclave is a posh neighborhood in South Delhi. It is adjacent to Gulmohar Park. It is a colony of 300 apartments and was constructed in 1983 by the Delhi Development Authority. It is now owned by the residents.

Gulmohar Enclave is located very close to green park metro and has many markets within walking distance .

It is an upscale area now with value for money apartments now valued at about  18.5 million (with larger apartments being valued around  3.4 million .

The area is famous for dog and cat lovers.

the colony has many well maintained parks
and children play areas

The RWA headed by Shri Sanjeev Sharma President

Smt Monika Gupta is the Secretary and is supported by members of the management committee

the colony has adequate water and electricity supply

broadband internet is available thru multiple ISP's

Notable/Important residents 

 Arti Mehra - Former Mayor of Municipal Corporation of Delhi (MCD) is a resident of Gulmohar Enclave.
 Col R K Kapoor - Producer and Director of Fauji, a popular Indian TV series of 1988, which launched the acting career of famous Bollywood star, Shahrukh Khan

Points of interest 

Nearby landmarks include Siri Fort Auditorium, Siri Fort Sports Complex, All India Institute of Medical Sciences, National Institute of Fashion Technology, Indian Institute of Technology Delhi, HUDCO Place, Yusuf Sarai Community Centre and Yusuf Sarai Market. It is also adjacent to the colonies of Green Park and Hauz Khas.

It is also less than 2 km from South Extension, R. K. Puram and other important areas of South Delhi.

Accessibility 

Indira Gandhi International Airport (Terminal 1 - Domestic) is 12 km away, Indira Gandhi International Airport (Terminal 3 - International) is 17 km away, New Delhi Railway Station is 14 km away and Hazrat Nizamuddin Railway Station is 8 km away.

The Delhi Metro has a station just 1/4 km from Gulmohar Enclave at Green Park through its Yellow Line (Delhi Metro). This line allows direct connections to Connaught Place (15 minutes), New Delhi Railway Station, (17 minutes) and Gurgaon (30 minutes).

South Delhi district